The Pembrokeshire League (currently the Manderwood Pembrokeshire League) is a football league in Pembrokeshire, West Wales, running from levels five to nine of the Welsh football league system.

Teams promoted from Division One may enter the West Wales Premier League if standards and facilities fall into line with the regulations of the Welsh Football League.

The Pembrokeshire League also enters teams into the West Wales Intermediate Cup, to play against clubs from the Carmarthenshire League, Neath & District League and Swansea Senior League. With Merlins Bridge beating fellow Pembrokeshire league side Carew in the 2019 final, this meant 4 of the last 7 winners had been Pembrokeshire League teams.

History
Newspaper articles from the early 1900s show the league existed in the pre-World War One period. The league was reformed for the 1945–46 season, and has played continuously since.

Clubs who have played in the Welsh Football League
The following teams from the league have played in the Welsh Football League across the following years:
 Haverfordwest County 
 Milford United (1936–37 to 2003–04 seasons)
 Monkton Swifts (1994–95 to 1999–2000 seasons)
 Pembroke Borough (1946–47 to 1994–95 seasons)

Member clubs for 2022–23 season

Division One

Carew
Clarbeston Road
Fishguard Sports
Goodwick United
Hakin United
Kilgetty
Merlins Bridge
Monkton Swifts
Neyland
Pennar Robins
St Clears
St Ishmaels

Division Two

Broad Haven
Carew II
Hakin United II
Herbrandston
Johnston
Merlins Bridge II
Milford United 
Monkton Swifts II 
Narberth
Pennar Robins II
Solva
Tenby

Division Three

Camrose 
Clarbeston Road II
Cosheston
Fishguard Sports II
Goodwick United II
Haverfordwest Cricket Club
Lawrenny
Letterston
Milford Athletic
Pembroke Borough
Pendine
St Florence

Division Four

Angle
Camrose II
Carew III
Haverfordwest Cricket Club II
Herbrandston II
Kilgetty II
Milford United II
Newport Tigers
Neyland II
Prendegast Villa
St Ishmaels II
Tenby II

Division Five

Broad Haven II
Cosheston II
Johnston II
Lawrenny II
Letterston II
Milford Athletic II
Monkton Swifts III 
New Hedges Saundersfoot United
Pembroke Borough II 
St Clears II

Champions: Top division

1900s

1903–04: Pembroke Dock
1904–05: Milford Haven
1905–06: 2nd Wiltshire Regiment
1906–07: 2nd Wiltshire Regiment
1907–08: Milford United
1908–09: Tenby?
1909–10: Milton Priory Mission
1910–11:
1911–12:
1912–13:
1913–14: Milford Town

A full list of the league's top flight champions since 1945–46 is as follows:

1940s

1945–46: RA Manorbier 
1946–47: RNAS Dale 
1947–48: Milford United
1948–49: Pembroke Borough
1959–50: Milford United

1950s

1950–51: Goodwick United 
1951–52: Hakin United
1952–53: RA Manorbier 
1953–54: RAF (Pembroke Dock) 
1954–55: Hakin United
1955–56: RAF (Pembroke Dock) 
1956–57: Narberth
1957–58: Narberth
1958–59: Narberth
1959–60: Narberth

1960s

1960–61: Haverfordwest County 
1961–62: Fishguard Sports  
1962–63: Milford United
1963–64: Hakin United
1964–65: Pembroke Borough
1965–66: Fishguard Sports  
1966–67: Fishguard Sports 
1967–68: St Clears
1968–69: Hakin United
1969–70: Fishguard Sports

1970s

1970–71: Carew
1971–72: Fishguard Sports 
1972–73: Fishguard Sports 
1973–74: Fishguard Sports 
1974–75: Fishguard Sports 
1975–76: Fishguard Sports  
1976–77: Carew 
1977–78: Goodwick United
1978–79: Merlins Bridge
1979–80: Merlins Bridge

1980s

1980–81: Johnston 
1981–82: Johnston 
1982–83: Johnston
1983–84: New Hedges/Saundersfoot 
1984–85: Carew 
1985–86: New Hedges/Saundersfoot 
1986–87: Fishguard Sports 
1987–88: Merlins Bridge
1988–89: Merlins Bridge
1989–90: Fishguard Sports

1990s

1990–91: Merlins Bridge
1991–92: Narberth 
1992–93: Merlins Bridge 
1993–94: Goodwick United 
1994–95: Merlins Bridge 
1995–96: Merlins Bridge 
1996–97: Hakin United 
1997–98: Hakin United
1998–99: Hakin United
1999–2000: Hakin United

2000s

2000–01: Hakin United
2001–02: Hakin United
2002–03: Hakin United
2003–04: Monkton Swifts 
2004–05: Monkton Swifts 
2005–06: Monkton Swifts 
2006–07: Monkton Swifts 
2007–08: Merlins Bridge
2008–09: Hakin United
2009–10: Merlins Bridge

2010s

2010–11: Hakin United
2011–12: Merlins Bridge
2012–13: Hakin United
2013–14: Hakin United
2014–15: Hakin United
2015–16: Goodwick United
2016–17: Hakin United
2017–18: Hakin United
2018–19: Monkton Swifts
2019–20: Hakin United

2020s

2020–21: Season void
2021–22: Hakin United
2022–23:

Number of titles by winning clubs (since 1945)

Hakin United – 20 titles
Fishguard Sports – 11 titles
Merlins Bridge – 11 tiles
Monkton Swifts – 5 titles
Narberth – 5 titles
Goodwick United – 4 titles
Carew – 3 titles
Johnston – 3 titles
Milford United – 3 titles
New Hedges/Saundersfoot – 2 titles
Pembroke Borough – 2 titles
RAF (Pembroke Dock) – 2 titles
RA Manorbier – 2 titles
Haverfordwest County –1 title
RNAS Dale – 1 title
St Clears – 1 title

Pembrokeshire Senior Cup
The league's main cup competition, the Pembrokeshire Senior Cup has been in operation since 1946-47.

See also
Football in Wales
List of football clubs in Wales

External links
Official league website
 Official league twitter account

References

 
Wales
Sport in Pembrokeshire
Sixth level football leagues in Europe
Football leagues in Wales